Peyk may refer to:

 Peyk, Azerbaijan
 Peyk, Iran (disambiguation)
 Peyk, East Azerbaijan
 Peyk, Markazi